U.S. Highway 90 (US 90), one of the major east–west U.S. Highways in the Southern United States, runs through southern Louisiana for , serving Lake Charles, Lafayette, New Iberia, Morgan City, and New Orleans. Much of it west of Lafayette and east of New Orleans has been supplanted by Interstate 10 (I-10) for all but local traffic, but the section between Lafayette and New Orleans runs a good deal south of I-10.

The stretch between Lafayette and New Orleans is planned as a southern extension of I-49 and is signed as "future corridor I-49". This part of the highway is important to the offshore petroleum industry, as it connects the cities of Lafayette and New Orleans to the port cities along the coast. Most of US 90 from New Iberia to New Orleans that has not already been improved to Interstate grade, is mainly an expressway, excepting the towns traversed through, that can be easily upgraded to freeway standards. The freeway east of Morgan City, bypassing Houma to the north, was originally built as Louisiana Highway 3052 (LS 3052); US 90 was shifted to it from its former alignment (now LA 182) once it was completed.

US 90 replaced almost all of the Louisiana section of the San Diego–St. Augustine running Old Spanish Trail. It was also designated Louisiana Highway 2 (LA 2) until the 1955 renumbering. A long section of the old road, from Lafayette to northeast of Raceland, is now LA 182.

Route description

State line to Lafayette
US 90 enters Louisiana at the Texas line over the Sabine River as part of I-10. Separating at exit 4 and running parallel on the north side of I-10 through Sulphur, before rejoining I-10 east of Westlake, crossing the Calcasieu River, and again splitting from I-10 at exit 31B (running on the south side of I-10) going through Lake Charles as Fruge, West 4th, then East 4th, before leaving town. In Iowa US 90 intersects with the southern terminus of US 165 continuing east through Lacassine, Welsh, Roanoke, Jennings, and Mermentau. East of Mermentau US 90 runs north of and parallel to a section of the Old Spanish Trail through Midland, Estherwood, and Crowley. In Crowley US 90 makes a north then east jog, bringing it close and parallel to I-10, passing through Rayne, Duson, Scott, and then into Lafayette.

Lafayette to Raceland
From Lafayette, US 90 traverses a south-southeast course to Patterson, where the highway takes a more easterly direction to New Orleans. The section east (south) of Broussard, beginning east of Captain Cade road but west of LA 88, to just west of Patterson, has been improved to Interstate grade and completed in June 2011. These improvements include the completion of the overpasses at Coteau Road (LA 88), Jefferson Island Road (LA 675), Center street (LA 14), Avery Island road (LA 329), South Lewis Street (Parish Road 605), Weeks Island road (LA 83), Darnall Road (Parish Road 211), Patout Road (LA 85), and Canal Street (LA 668). This section ties into the already completed section that begins at LA 318 and terminates at East Main street (LA 182) just east of Calumet.

New Orleans
US 90 enters Jefferson Parish, and after passing Avondale, heads north at an intersection with US 90 Business, called the Westbank Expressway, through Bridge City, and across the Mississippi River over the Huey P. Long Bridge. The original highway was changed to follow US 90 and LA 48. After 1935 Jefferson became S. Claiborne Avenue at the Orleans Parish line and makes a sweeping south-to-north semicircle weaving through New Orleans. As the highway swings north it intersects and runs under an elevated I-10, where it turns northwest along Tulane Avenue. The stretch in the Lake Catherine community is where Jayne Mansfield was killed in a car accident on her way to New Orleans from Mississippi.

In St. Tammany Parish, US 90 then enters Slidell. After exiting Slidell it heads east and crosses the Mississippi state line at a drawbridge at the Pearl River.
The Jefferson Highway was the first north/south transcontinental highway in America, the second interstate highway, after the Lincoln Highway that it intersects in Colo, Iowa, but was the first international interstate highway in the world.

Interstates 49 and 910
The Business US 90 portion of the Pontchartrain Expressway is also designated as Interstate 910, however it is not signed as such. This is a temporary designation that overlaps all freeway portions of Business US 90 (the Pontchartrain Expressway, Crescent City Connection, and Westbank Expressway). When Interstate 49 is completed from Lafayette to New Orleans, Business US 90/Interstate 910 will be resigned as Interstate 49.

History

The modern US 90 has its roots in an early 20th-century auto trail known as the Old Spanish Trail, which was designated as State Route 2 within Louisiana when the state first numbered its highway system in 1921. US 90 was applied to the route when the numbered U.S. Highway system was implemented in 1926. With minor exceptions, Route 2 generally remained co-signed with US 90 throughout the state until such overlapping between U.S. and state routes was eliminated in the 1955 Louisiana Highway renumbering. Prior to 1955, as US 90 was gradually relocated onto newer and improved alignments, Route 2 was often moved accordingly. Former alignments remaining in the state highway system were then designated as part of State Route 1092, with shorter pieces designated as Route 2-D, 2-E, and so on as needed.

In Calcasieu Parish, on the border with Orange, Texas, US 90 originally crossed the Sabine River eastward into East Orange, Louisiana, a town consisting primarily of gambling, showboats, and supper clubs. The bridge over the Sabine River was removed after US 90 had been rerouted northward in Orange onto Simmons Drive and Interstate 10.
In Lake Charles, US 90 traveled from Westlake down present-day Mike Hooks Road to cross the Calcasieu River on a bridge built in 1916. The road then traveled along Shell Beach and Lakeshore Drive to continue eastward on Broad Street. This alignment changed with the completion of the Lake Charles I-10 Bridge in 1952.
In St. Charles Parish and Lafourche Parish, US 90 traveled down present-day LA 631, crossing the swing bridge still used by local traffic in Des Allemands.
In Lafourche Parish, the old US 90 (now LA 182) splits off from the current US 90/Future I-49 just northeast of Raceland. Further southwest it enters Raceland, intersecting with LA 308, then immediately afterwards crosses Bayou Lafourche over a lift bridge. The route then goes to the right, through the middle of Raceland coaligned with LA 1 for a few thousand feet. It then takes a turn to the southwest as Willow Street or Old Houma Road, interchanging with US 90/Future I-49. Just south of this interchange, it travels as a four-lane highway until the junction with Prospect Blvd./LA 3087. Old Highway 90/LA 182 then heads to Bayou Blue and on to downtown Houma as a major two-lane highway. LA 653 was US 90's original route but was supplanted in the 1950s by its current route, what is now LA 182, and most of this original road has been abandoned.
Jefferson Parish:
1926–1928: The original alignment of US 90 generally followed today's LA 18 through Jefferson Parish and crossed the Mississippi River into Orleans Parish (city of New Orleans) via the Jackson Avenue Ferry at Gretna. The exact routing was as follows:
LA 18 (River Road) from the St. Charles Parish line eastbound to Avondale.
The original road through the Avondale shipyards continued straight along the river levee and no longer exists.
LA 541 (continuation of River Road) and Bridge City Avenue through Bridge City.
LA 18 (Seven Oaks Boulevard, formerly Bridge City Avenue) to Westwego.
LA 541 (River Road), Sala Avenue, and LA 18 (Fourth Street) through Westwego.
LA 18 (Fourth Street, Barataria Boulevard, and continuation of Fourth Street) to Gretna.
Huey P. Long Avenue to the Gretna Ferry landing.
1928–1930: US 90 was re-routed over the Walnut Street Ferry in September 1928, shortening the route in Jefferson Parish to the former ferry landing at River Road and Sala Avenue in Westwego.
1930–1937: US 90 was restored to its original route through Jefferson Parish in May 1930, after widening and resurfacing of the Westwego-Gretna section was completed in April.
1937–1941: The Huey P. Long Bridge was opened in December 1935. US 90 was re-routed over the bridge, following Jefferson Highway into Orleans Parish, after widening of that thoroughfare to four lanes was completed in 1937. (LA 2 remained on the old alignment until the 1955 renumbering of Louisiana highways.)
1941–present: The current alignment (the "Boutte Cutoff") west of the Huey P. Long Bridge was opened in April 1941, bypassing the winding river road. This alignment was widened to four lanes in 1953.
Orleans Parish (west of Peoples Avenue):
1926–1928: US 90 originally followed this route through New Orleans, starting from the Jackson Avenue Ferry landing:
Jackson Avenue and South Claiborne Avenue to downtown New Orleans.
Canal Street, North Broad Avenue, Bruxelles Street, and Gentilly Boulevard to Peoples Avenue.
The above route, though signed in the field, had several problems that were mostly alleviated by a re-routing in 1928:
The New Basin Canal bridge on South Claiborne Avenue had been closed in 1923 due to safety concerns. A temporary bridge was opened in July 1928, but it was a traffic bottleneck.
Bruxelles Street became a one-way street in 1926, forcing westbound traffic to follow the unpaved Paris and St. Bernard Avenues from Gentilly to Broad.
Jackson Avenue was also unpaved beyond St. Charles Avenue and did not connect directly to South Claiborne Avenue westbound.
The Jackson Avenue Ferry service was considered to be inferior to that of the Walnut Street Ferry which the Old Spanish Trail had followed for years.
1928–1930: The route of US 90 was revised above Canal Street in September 1928, utilizing a better ferry and avoiding the New Basin Canal bridge and railroad crossings on South Claiborne Avenue. From the Walnut Street Ferry landing, the revised route was as follows:
Walnut Street, St. Charles Avenue to Lee Circle, Howard Avenue, and Camp Street to Canal Street.
Because of one-way streets, westbound traffic followed Canal Street, St. Charles Avenue, and Audubon Street to the Walnut Street Ferry landing.
1930–1931: In spite of protests, US 90 was routed back over the Jackson Avenue Ferry in May 1930, following Jackson Avenue, St. Charles Avenue, Washington Avenue, and South Claiborne Avenue to Canal Street.
1931–1937: After Jackson Avenue was paved between St. Charles Avenue and South Claiborne Avenue in October 1931, the Washington Avenue detour was eliminated. Paving of Paris and St. Bernard Avenues was completed in March 1932, but eastbound traffic still followed Bruxelles Street.
1937–1939: After being re-routed over the Huey P. Long Bridge, US 90 now entered Orleans Parish on South Claiborne Avenue, following South Carrollton Avenue and Canal Street to North Broad Avenue.
1939–1946: US 90 shortly began to follow South Claiborne Avenue directly to Canal Street.
1946–1956: The Bruxelles Street link was finally eliminated. Eastbound traffic now followed St. Bernard and Paris Avenues from Broad to Gentilly. Westbound traffic followed St. Bernard Avenue only.
1956–1975: US 90 was re-routed over the North Broad Avenue extension and railroad underpass that had been opened in April 1952. Eastbound traffic was fed onto Allen Street to Gentilly Boulevard. Westbound traffic followed New Orleans Street from Gentilly Boulevard onto North Broad Avenue.
1975–present: The final change in routing was the substitution of Tulane Avenue for Canal Street around 1975.
Orleans Parish (east of Peoples Avenue):
1926–1929: Continuing from the intersection of Gentilly Boulevard and Peoples Avenue, the original route of US 90 through eastern New Orleans was as follows:
Old Gentilly Road to the Industrial Canal. US 90 crossed the canal over the L&N Railroad bridge (also known as the Almonaster Avenue Bridge), a combination railroad/vehicular bridge opened in 1919 now closed to vehicular traffic. The bridge was originally connected to Old Gentilly Road via two sharp right-angle turns on either side.
Continuation of Old Gentilly Road to Michoud.
US 90 remains on its original alignment (Chef Menteur Highway) from Michoud to a point two miles west of the Chef Menteur Bridge, where the original road continued to the left along Bayou Sauvage. Portions of this road still exist as Old Chef Menteur Road and Fort Macomb Road.
US 90 crossed the Chef Menteur Pass by ferry, then continued along the current alignment toward the Rigolets. About a third of the way to the Rigolets, a curve on the south side of the road has been bypassed.
At the approach to the Rigolets Bridge, US 90 continued straight ahead on a road which no longer exists to the site of the Rigolets Ferry to St. Tammany Parish.
1929–1930: The Chef Menteur Bridge was opened in September 1929, replacing the ferry service.
1930–1932: The Rigolets Bridge (with new approach road) was opened in June 1930, followed shortly by the first section of Chef Menteur Highway between Downman Road and Lee Station. The route was now:
Old Gentilly Road to the Industrial Canal, with the dangerous bridge approaches smoothed out. The eastern approach now fed traffic onto the new Chef Menteur Highway.
Current US 90 (Chef Menteur Highway) to Lee Station, curving back onto Old Gentilly Road just east of present-day Crowder Boulevard.
Old Gentilly Road to Michoud.
Current US 90 (Chef Menteur Highway) and old approach (described above) to Chef Menteur Pass.
Current US 90 (Chef Menteur Highway) across Chef Menteur and Rigolets bridges to St. Tammany Parish.
1932–1934: The Peoples Avenue-Downman Road section of Chef Menteur Highway, including a new bridge over the Industrial Canal, was opened in 1932. The original Danziger Bridge existed on the north side of the current bridge.
1934–1942: The permanent approach road to the Chef Menteur Bridge was finally opened, eliminating the road along Bayou Sauvage with right-angle turn onto the bridge.
1942–present: The "Michoud Cutoff," the section of Chef Menteur Highway from Lee Station to Michoud, was opened in May 1942, completing the current alignment.
In St. Tammany Parish, US 90 originally took a much longer route toward Mississippi. After crossing the Rigolets, US 90 traveled along LA 433 (Old Spanish Trail) to Slidell, then US 11 (Front Street) to Pearl River, continuing onto LA 3081 (Main Street). The bridge across the West Pearl River no longer exists. The route continued onto Old US 11, crossing the site of current US 11/I-59. Old US 11 continues through the Pearl River State Wildlife Management Area to the Mississippi state line, where a bridge once crossed the Pearl River. This out-of-the-way alignment was bypassed around 1930 when the current alignment to Pearlington was constructed. US 11 was subsequently routed onto it.

Future
In Louisiana, current plans call for parts of US 90 to be upgraded to Interstate Highway standards from Lafayette to just west of New Orleans and designated I-49. The stretch of US 90 to be upgraded to I-49 stretches from the West Bank Expressway (US 90 Business near Westwego) to just north of downtown Lafayette, where US 90 splits from US 167 (the two highways converge in downtown Lafayette). The stretch of US 167 from US 90 to I-10 will also be upgraded and included as part of I-49. As of March 2008, due to a $1 billion surplus in the Louisiana state budget, the legislature approved a bill which proposed capacity improvements on US 90 in the Lafayette area. US 167/US 90 is currently six-lanes from I-10 in Lafayette to LA 182 and LA 96 in Broussard.

Major intersections

Related routes
US 90 Bus. (90-X) runs mainly along the old alignment through downtown Lake Charles, while US 90 uses I-10 and the newer Fruge Street.
US 90 Bus. (90-Y) is the old route through downtown Lafayette, mostly along LA 182.
US 90 Bus. (90-W) is mostly the old route (LA 182) through and east of Morgan City.
US 90 Bus. (90-Z) is more of a bypass than a business route in the New Orleans area, running along the Westbank Expressway.
US 190 splits from US 90 east of Slidell, just west of the Mississippi state line. It heads west into Texas, staying north of US 90.

References

External links

La DOTD State, District, and Parish Maps
Article; "Following in the Lincoln's Wake: The Jefferson Highway"  by Lyell Henry

90
 Louisiana
090
Transportation in Acadia Parish, Louisiana
Transportation in Assumption Parish, Louisiana
Transportation in Calcasieu Parish, Louisiana
Transportation in Iberia Parish, Louisiana
Transportation in Jefferson Parish, Louisiana
Transportation in Jefferson Davis Parish, Louisiana
Transportation in Lafayette Parish, Louisiana
Transportation in Lafourche Parish, Louisiana
Transportation in New Orleans
Transportation in St. Charles Parish, Louisiana
Transportation in St. Martin Parish, Louisiana
Transportation in St. Mary Parish, Louisiana
Transportation in St. Tammany Parish, Louisiana
Transportation in Terrebonne Parish, Louisiana